Midway City is a city in Orange County, California.

Midway City may also refer to:

 Midway City, a fictional city in the Big Bang Comics universe, known for being the home of Knight Watchman
 Midway City, a fictional city in the DC Comics universe, known for being the home of Hawkman (Katar Hol). It is set in the Midwestern United States

See also 
 Midway (disambiguation)
 Midway Township (disambiguation)